Jonas Olsson is the name of:

 Jonas Olsson (footballer, born 1970), Swedish football manager and former player
 Jonas Olsson (footballer, born 1983), Swedish footballer
 Jonas Olsson (footballer, born 1990), Swedish footballer
 Jonas Olsson (cyclist), Swedish cyclist; competed at the 2002 European Road Championships
 Jonas Olsson (ice hockey), Swedish ice hockey player in 2011–12 GET-ligaen season
 Jonas Olsson (music producer), Finnish music producer, sound engineer and songwriter